Pierre Wibaux (January 12, 1858 – March 21, 1913) was a French cattle owner and ranchman in Montana and North Dakota at the turn of the 20th century. He immigrated from his native France to seek business opportunities in America and was among the most successful in the second wave of "Frontier Cowboys".

Early life
Pierre Wibaux was born on January 12, 1858, to a prosperous family of textile industrialists in Roubaix, situated in the north of France. Pierre's father, Achille, ran the family textile factory he had inherited from his own father, Desiré Joseph Wibaux, and it was expected that Pierre would be the next in line to manage the family business.
In 1876 he spent a year serving in the army with the French Dragoons (as Pierre was an excellent rider), then left to England for 2 years to observe how English textile industry worked. It was during this time that he first heard mention of the promising cattle-ranching opportunities in America from relatives of British families who had emigrated and found success overseas.
Upon his return to France, he announced that he was going to travel to America to try his luck at cattle ranching rather than taking over the family business in his Roubaix. With much reluctance his father agreed and gave him $10 000 to start his new venture.

Cattle ranching
In 1883, Pierre immigrated to America and travels to Chicago to learn more about the range stock business before investing any capital. There he meets the Marquis de Mores, who tells him of the prairies in North Dakota and Montana. Wibaux decides to settle there and builds his ranch on what was formerly known as Beaver Creek. The conditions in the area are ideal for raising stock and Wibaux's ranch quickly gains well over 10 000 heads of cattle.
Business thrives until the region is hit by an extremely harsh winter in 1886-87. It is estimated that around 70% of the cattle in the area perish in the long snowstorms. Pierre Wibaux saw an opportunity in this: only the sturdiest and most resilient beasts survived this trial, so Pierre went back to France to borrow the necessary funds to buy out all the remaining cattle from desperate neighbouring ranchers at low prices. Also, the shortage of beef available ensured high sale prices for Wibaux's stock for the following 3 years. In the 1890s, Wibaux had amassed one of the largest herds in the world, with over 65,000 cattle and 300 horses. As a result, he befriends a certain  Theodore Roosevelt, a fellow cattle-rancher who would give up the stock business to go on and become the 26th president of the United States from 1901 to 1909.

Other activities
Wibaux, being a main land-owner in the area started to develop infrastructures and services in the area. He became the President and 95% owner of the State National Bank in Miles City, and also opened his own national bank in Forsyth, of which he was the president. This particular position gave him the right to sign dollar bills to issue money, making him the only ever Frenchman ever to do so.
Pierre was also to be the only owner of the Clover Leaf Gold Mining Company which was thriving on gold-mines in the Black Hills region.

Philanthropy
Like the Carnegies and Rockefellers of his time, Wibaux too was a philanthropist. He always remained attached to his native Roubaix and was among the large contributors to help build the Hôpital de la Fraternité.
He donated 25 000 Francs to establish "model Farms" which would produce quality milk for those in need (in early 1900s France, bad nutritional hygiene was a major cause of infant mortality). This generous contribution helped put in place the "Goutte de Lait" foundation, of which Wibaux was named president.
Finally, for all of his industrial and agricultural achievements and philanthropic work, Pierre Wibaux was awarded the "National Order of the Legion of Honour", the highest and most prestigious decoration in France (much like Knights and Dames in England).

Legacy
Wibaux's "W-Bar Ranch" was so successful that a community of employees, cowboys, cattlemen and their families emerged from this business and grouped to form a village then a town, named Wibaux after Pierre himself.
Wibaux County, surrounding the town of Wibaux, is also named after him.
The town which emerged from the Wibaux's gold-miner community in the Black Hills region also bore the mark of Pierre Wibaux as he named the town after his beloved and native Roubaix.
St Peter's Catholic Church in Wibaux is named after him. The original church that he had built is still standing, although a newer building replaced it in the 1960s. Supposedly, when Wibaux's father visited him from France, he was upset to find that there was no church for his son and others to worship in.
A twice-size statue of Pierre Wibaux stands on a hill west of Wibaux overlooking the town, looking north toward the ranch twelve miles away, and some of his remains are contained in the base of the statue.  His wife Nellie and son Cyril spent the rest of their lives in France, and are buried at Père Lachaise Cemetery in Paris. For his doctoral work at the University of Missouri in Columbia, Donald Hugh Welsh went to France and consulted original documents made available to him by the Wibaux family.

References

1858 births
1913 deaths
People from Wibaux County, Montana
People from Roubaix
Ranchers from Montana
French emigrants to the United States
Recipients of the Legion of Honour